Edward C. Thiel (May 4, 1928 – November 9, 1961), was a geologist from the University of Wisconsin and chief seismologist at Ellsworth Station Antarctica, from 1956 to 1958. He was leader of the traverse party that discovered the Thiel Trough submarine valley that was later named in his honor. The Thiel Mountains were also named after him.

Thiel was killed on November 9, 1961 while returning from a geomagnetic survey mission to Mirny Station. The P2V-7 (Bu No.140439) Neptune aircraft from US Navy Squadron VX-6 in which he was a passenger crashed at Wilkes Station in Antarctica, where it had refueled overnight, and was en route back to McMurdo Station.

References

1928 births
1961 deaths
20th-century American geologists
University of Wisconsin–Madison faculty
Seismologists